Thuma Peak is a mainly ice-free peak in the Desko Mountains, rising  northwest of Overton Peak in southeast Rothschild Island. It was named by the Advisory Committee on Antarctic Names for Captain Jack S. Thuma, U.S. Coast Guard.

References 

Mountains of Palmer Land